Donell is a given name. Notable people with the name include:

Donell "D.J." Cooper (born 1990), American basketball player in the Israeli Basketball Premier League
Donell Jones (born 1973), American R&B singer, songwriter and record producer
Donell Nixon (born 1961), American former center and left fielder in Major League Baseball
Donell Taylor (born 1982), American professional basketball player

See also
List of people named O'Donnell